Beautiful music (sometimes abbreviated as BM, B/EZ or BM/EZ for "beautiful music/easy listening") is a mostly instrumental music format that was prominent in North American radio from the late 1950s through the 1980s. Easy listening, elevator music, light music, mood music, and Muzak are other terms that overlap with this format and the style of music that it featured. Beautiful music can also be regarded as a subset of the middle of the road radio format.

History
Beautiful music initially offered soft and unobtrusive instrumental selections on a very structured schedule with limited commercial interruptions. It often functioned as a free background music service for stores, with commercial breaks consisting only of announcements aimed at shoppers already in the stores. This practice was known as "storecasting" and was very common on the FM dial in the 1940s and 1950s.

Many of these FM stations usually simulcast their AM station and used a subcarrier (SCA) to transmit a hitch-hiker signal to a store receiver by subscription. The signal was usually a slow-moving audio tape of "background music" or Muzak-type service, which was independent of the simulcast AM signal.

Some FM stations made more income from these music subscriptions than from their main programming. WITH-FM, in Baltimore, Maryland (1950s and 1960s), had to keep its FM carrier on the air until 2:00a.m. for restaurant subscribers, and could not sign-off the main FM carrier until that time and thus had to run a repeat of its previous day's evening concert on its main FM program line.

Growth as a radio format
One of the first beautiful music radio stations in the US was KIXL in the Dallas-Ft. Worth, Texas, area. As early as 1947 it played orchestral music on AM radio (1040), and later on FM (104.5). KIXL changed to KEZL (as in "easy listening") in 1973, but ended with a change to adult contemporary in 1976.

In 1959, Gordon McLendon, who had interests in Top-40 radio in Dallas as well as other markets, decided to "counter-program" in San Francisco since several Top-40 stations were already there. McLendon established beautiful music AM station KABL (a tribute to the San Francisco cable cars, named by McLendon's executive assistant Billie Page Odom) which was successful through the 1990s. It then experimented with combining elements of Big Bands and soft rock until its demise in the early 21st century. It was reborn as an Internet radio station where it can be heard today.

In the early 1960s, the Federal Communications Commission adopted a standard for transmitting and receiving stereo signals on a single channel of the FM band. In addition to delivering stereo sound, FM broadcasting provided clearer sound quality and better resistance to interference than AM, thus being ideal for broadcasting the beautiful music format.

In Baltimore, Maryland, programmer Art Wander developed a beautiful music format for the 50,000-watt NBC affiliate WBAL/1090. The station format launched in the fall of 1960 featured music sweeps of lush instrumentals with subtle comments from their staff announcers. The format changed to sports and talk when competing FM stations broadcast beautiful music and easy listening.

In 1963, Marlin Taylor created a custom-designed beautiful music format at Philadelphia's WDVR. Within four months, WDVR became the #1 rated FM station in the Philadelphia market. This was one of the first big successes in FM broadcasting, and was instrumental in establishing the viability of FM.  WDVR was a resource for mature listeners who were driven from AM radio at the time when WFIL and WIBG (and others) switched to rock 'n' roll programming. WDVR's billboards made the adult audience aware of the new station.

Airtime resell practice. Libraries of music for radio stations 
Others, such as Jim Schulke, devised a method of buying air time on FM stations in bulk and reselling the blocks to interested advertisers. Schulke formed Stereo Radio Productions (SRP) to help his stations get better ratings and pull in more agency advertising dollars. His stations used six hundred  reels of stereo reel-to-reel tape set on multiple machines so that 15 minute segments would play at a time, alternating from one player to another, allowing a varied programming format in which no half-hour was repeated within a two-week period. One of Schulke's stations using this "matched flow" concept was WDVR's chief competitor in the beautiful music format in Philadelphia, WWSH-FM.

Peters Productions in San Diego, California was active throughout the late 1960s through the early 1980s. At one time Peters Productions offered 7 different syndicated radio formats plus radio/television "station image" packages (custom jingle and integrated promotional graphics packages.) The most popular syndicated radio format was a beautiful music format on a library of 100 reel-to-reel tapes, with 6 new reels provided per month. It originated when founder Ed Peters was station manager of San Diego radio station KFMB-FM. The format aired on over 120 stations during its peak, and was known originally as "Music Only For A Woman." Later the name was changed to "Music Just For The Two of Us."

Stereotypical instrumental-vocal mixes, related to BM/EZ 

Many beautiful music programmers constructed their own style of sets, incorporating some vocal songs, usually one to each 15-minute set. Most stations adopted a 70-80% instrumental - 20-30% vocal mix, a few offered 90% instrumentals, and a handful were entirely instrumental. Initially, the vocalists consisted of artists such as Frank Sinatra, Nat King Cole, Peggy Lee, Tony Bennett, Patti Page, Johnny Mathis, Perry Como, Doris Day, and others. By the 1970s, softer songs by artists like The Carpenters, Anne Murray, John Denver, Barry Manilow, Barbra Streisand, Dionne Warwick, Neil Diamond, Elton John, Nancy Wilson and others were added to the mix on many stations. Also, some of these stations even played soft songs by artists like Elvis Presley, Beatles, Billy Joel, and other rock-based artists. The main test for the vocals played was not the background of the artist but whether or not the song is extremely soft. All vocals on such stations had to be extremely soft. Therefore, on one hand a song like "She's Out Of My Life" by a non-core artist like Michael Jackson would be heard on some of these stations; similarly, "Crazy for You" or "Live to Tell" by Madonna. On the other hand, even uptempo jazzier songs by standards artists, such as "Detour" by Patti Page, would not be heard on beautiful music stations except during specialty shows.

Also, during weekday morning drive times, most beautiful music stations increased the vocals to as much as 50 percent to accommodate a broader audience.

While these stations were mostly playing instrumentals, some had a couple of specialty programs that were vocal-based such as a Big Band program on Saturday nights, a Frank Sinatra show sometime on the weekends, and maybe a program featuring Broadway showtunes.

Generally, the recordings heard on beautiful music stations were newly orchestrated arrangements of the songs of the day.  These were available from the major record labels and performed by such artists as Andre Kostelanetz, Percy Faith, Mantovani, the 101 Strings, Billy Vaughn, The Living Strings, Frank Chacksfield, among others.  When the record companies cut back on releasing this material, syndicators of the format had custom recordings produced for them, performed by many different orchestras from around the world.  These new custom recordings were usually instrumental versions of current or recent rock and roll or pop hit songs, a move intended to give the stations more mass appeal without selling out, but also disgusted some longtime listeners of the format. Some stations would also occasionally play earlier big band-era recordings from the 1940s and early 1950s.

Many beautiful music stations would air a few Christmas songs per hour beginning around Thanksgiving each year, increasing their frequency as the month of December progressed. The stations' vocal content would typically increase to about 40 to 60 percent of the playlist during this period, as well. There would then be a special marathon of seasonal music on December 24 and December 25. After the 25th, most continued to play wall-to-wall Christmas music until the first of the year. This concept was later borrowed (and expanded upon) by Soft AC, Oldies, and even some country music and Hot AC stations. Today, the average wall-to-wall Christmas format begins on Thanksgiving and ends at the end of the day around midnight on December 26.

The predominantly instrumental-vocal mix is still in use today, mainly by smooth jazz stations.

Declining years 
Peters was the first beautiful music syndicator to sell its library in the late 1980s to Broadcast Programming, Inc., which then bought several other syndicators. (BPI, later part of Jones Radio Networks, is part of Dial Global as of 2012.) Bonneville, which had acquired the SRP and Century catalogs in the 1980s, sold its beautiful music assets to Broadcast Programming in November 1993.

Some beautiful music stations (especially on AM) successfully transitioned to adult contemporary formats, often with call letter changes to shed the "elevator music" identity. Many of these stations marketed themselves as playing many of the same songs from the original artists; adult contemporary had the benefit of having core acts that could much more easily be marketed and were more familiar to listeners, as opposed to the lesser-known and poorer-selling studio acts that made up the majority of the beautiful music format.

Beautiful music stations declined in the late 1980s and early 1990s as country music became popular and moved to the FM dial (formerly, country was relegated to AM). Many beautiful music stations, especially in rural areas, switched to country around that time.

List of instrumental artists associated with "beautiful music" radio format era 

 Some instrumental artists associated with beautiful music have included:
101 Strings Orchestra
12 Girls Band
André Kostelanetz
Anne Murray
Arthur Fiedler
Arthur Greenslade
Arthur Lyman
Bert Kaempfert
Billy Vaughn and his Orchestra
Bob James
Bradley Joseph
Burt Bacharach
Caravelli
Carl Doy
Charles Williams
Cyril Ornadel
David Rose
Enoch Light
Eric Coates
Ernest Tomlinson
Felix Slatkin
Ferrante & Teicher
Floyd Cramer
Francis Lai
Franck Pourcel
Frank Chacksfield
Frank Cordell
Frank De Vol
Frank Perkins
Geoff Love
George Melachrino
George Shearing Quintette
Geraldo (and his New Concert Orchestra)
Henry Mancini
Hollyridge Strings
Hugo Winterhalter
Jackie Gleason
James Galway
James Last
Joe Harnell
John Barry
John Williams
Johnny Douglas
Johnny Pearson
Lawrence Welk
Leroy Anderson
Les Baxter
Lex de Azevedo
Liberace
Living Strings
Longines Symphonette
Mantovani
Morton Gould
Nelson Riddle and his Orchestra
Nick Ingman
Norrie Paramor
Paul Mauriat
Paul Weston
Percy Faith
Peter Nero
Peter Yorke
Ray Martin
Richard Clayderman
Richard Hayman
Robert Farnon
Robert Maxwell
Roger Williams
Ron Goodwin
Ronald Binge
Ronnie Aldrich
Sidney Torch
Stanley Black
Syd Dale
Tony Mottola
Victor Young
Wes Montgomery

List of vocal artists associated with "beautiful music" radio format era 

 Among the vocal artists featured on beautiful music stations may include many of the same ones featured on the adult standards format and others:
ABBA (softer selections)
Andy Williams
Anita Kerr Singers
Anne Murray
B.J. Thomas
Barbra Streisand
Barry Manilow
Bing Crosby
Captain & Tennille
Carly Simon
Connie Francis
Dan Fogelberg
Dean Martin
Diana Krall
Doris Day
Elvis Presley (softer selections)
Engelbert Humperdinck
Frank Sinatra
Harry Connick, Jr.
Helen Reddy
Jack Jones
Jo Stafford
John Denver
John Gary
Johnny Mann Singers
Johnny Mathis
Linda Ronstadt
Matt Monro
Melissa Manchester
Michael Bublé
Nana Mouskouri
Nancy Wilson
Nat King Cole
Neil Diamond
Norah Jones
Olivia Newton-John
Patti Page
Perry Como
Petula Clark
Ray Charles Singers
Ray Conniff Singers
Rosemary Clooney
Sérgio Mendes
Snatam Kaur
Steve Lawrence
The Association
The Beatles (softer selections)
The Carpenters
The Lettermen
Vic Damone

Today
The beautiful music format has not yet died completely.  Today's smooth jazz radio stations maintain the structure and style of the beautiful music format.  The format continues on a few non-commercial radio stations, including KCEA (89.1 FM) in Atherton, California; KWXY (1340 AM) in Cathedral City, California KLUX (89.5 FM) in Corpus Christi, Texas; KHOY (88.1 FM) in Laredo, Texas; KNCT-FM (91.3 FM) in Killeen, Texas; KGUD (90.7 FM) in Longmont, Colorado.

Jones College of Jacksonville operated WKTZ-FM, a beautiful music noncommercial station, from its 1964 founding until 2014, when it sold the station (and sister station WJAX) to national Christian broadcaster Educational Media Foundation for $3.375 million. EMF ended the beautiful music format and switched WKTZ-FM to WJKV, broadcasting its in-house satellite K-Love network.

Some commercial beautiful music stations still exist, often in areas with large retiree populations. These are often popular in their markets. An annual influx of vacationers from colder climates has helped such stations as KAHM (102.1 MHz) in Prescott, Arizona, and, until 2021 KWXY (1340 kHz) in Cathedral City, California. Most of the remaining commercial beautiful music stations are primarily in markets with major resorts. An exception is WGCY in Gibson City, Illinois which serves rural areas in Central Illinois with mostly instrumental beautiful music. Today most stations that play beautiful music are either characterized as nostalgia, smooth jazz or easy listening. In Canada, Evanov Communications' "Jewel"-branded stations in Ontario and Quebec (including CKDX-FM in metro Toronto, CJWL-FM in Ottawa, and CHSV-FM in metropolitan Montreal, among others), which play soft adult contemporary music during the day and standards in the evening, feature an hour of traditional beautiful music from 11:00 p.m. to midnight, dubbing the program "The Instrumental Concert Series". The Cleveland market features non-profit WKHR 91.5, which plays many classic beautiful and light jazz instrumentals from the 1930s through the 1960s, as well as timeless pop and jazz vocals.

Radio production veteran Jason 'Jake' Longwell, currently produces and hosts a weekly hour long radio program devoted to Beautiful Music called Something Beautiful based out of his own studios in Geneva, New York.

Beautiful music without FM radio 
Sirius XM Satellite Radio programs a dedicated beautiful music channel, Escape, for its subscribers, and such services as Music Choice and DMX provide the format as part of their offerings to cable and satellite television subscribers.

Muzak also provides several beautiful music channels which are described as "environmental" background music channels.

After financial difficulties forced a sale and subsequent format change of KNXR in Rochester, Minnesota, the original owner in 2016 revived its easy listening format on the internet, at 97five.com.

Instrumental beautiful music can also be found on a number of Internet radio feeds.
 Many FM stations above have Internet "doubles".
 Some "internet radios" have dedicated smartphone apps. Most apps would play music as a background task.
 On a similar note: Seeburg 1000's libraries of light music (which are considered to be background music of the 1960s) are also recreated as a bm/ez-like internet "radio" (seeburg1000.com). It also comes as a mobile app for smartphones that plays music while minimized, hidden from the screen into background.

An experience similar to "beautiful music" format of aired music may be achieved by using ad-blocking software on some popular sites with ads and free access. 
 Most simplistic example for mobile users is to use Firefox Focus kind of Firefox web browser to enter a video streaming site and find a video featuring a compilation of music tracks. This way, it will be possible to play, say, "WGER Beautiful Music Radio Station Aircheck early 1970s", "WJBR 995 FM Wilmington Delaware early 1970s" or "WJOI FM 97 Beautiful Music aircheck around 1987" video on YouTube without dealing with ads. 
 For PC version of Firefox web browser, there are easy ways to add "extensions", such as "UOrigin" or "Ad Nauseam".

Antipractice, opposite to BM/EZ 

Some radio stations in Europe are notorious for botching up their blocks of ad-free music, ruining the "beautiful music/easy listening"-like experience. While there are no ads indeed, DJs of such radio add loud announcements only to boast how ad-free their music is. This practice may be either an aggressive search for ad time buyers or an unintended failure to deliver the experience of uninterrupted ad-free BM. For example, 89.5 Megapolis FM in Moscow, Russia adds loud "You're listening to Megapolis FM" announcements to their nighttime music.

List of radio stations, related to BM/EZ 

As mentioned above, many radio stations have Internet doubles and some even have own mobile apps. Therefore, it may be possible to listen to a town-scale or city-scale BM/EZ-like radio station from another state. This very list also may come in useful for listening to "airchecks" - old, archived and posted on YouTube compilations of music.

WVTL in Amsterdam, New York
WPCH in Atlanta, Georgia
KGFM in Bakersfield, California
KICE-FM in Bend, Oregon
WLIF and Art Wander-programmed WBAL in Baltimore, Maryland
WHDH-FM, WHUE-AM-FM, WJIB-FM, and WWEL-AM-FM in Boston, Massachusetts
WEZN in Bridgeport, Connecticut
WHBC-FM in Canton, Ohio
WEZC, WBT-FM and WRLX in Charlotte, North Carolina
WDEF-FM in Chattanooga, Tennessee
WLAK, WLOO, WCLR, WNUS-FM and WAIT in Chicago, Illinois
KPAY-FM in Chico, California
WWEZ, WLVV and WAEF (later WLQA) in Cincinnati, Ohio
WDOK, WKSW, WDBN, WBEA, WNOB, and WQAL in Cleveland, Ohio
KRDO-FM in Colorado Springs, Colorado
WBUK (later WTVN-FM) and WBNS-FM in Columbus, Ohio
KBOX (later KTLC and KMEZ-FM), KIXL (later KEZT) and KOAX in Dallas/Fort Worth
WDAQ in Danbury, Connecticut
WHIO in Dayton, Ohio
KLIR and KOSI in Denver, Colorado
WJR-FM and WWJ-FM (later WJOI) in Detroit, Michigan
KPNW-FM in Eugene, Oregon
WAVV in Fort Myers, Florida
WFRE in Frederick, Maryland
KLTA and KKNU in Fresno, California
WOOD-FM in Grand Rapids, Michigan
WGLD in Greensboro, North Carolina
WWMD in Hagerstown, Maryland
WRCH and WKSS in Hartford, Connecticut
KYND-FM, KODA-AM-FM, KXYZ in Houston, Texas
WRSA-FM in Huntsville, Alabama
WXTZ-FM in Indianapolis, Indiana
WKTZ in Jacksonville
KONA-FM in Tri-Cities
WFYN in Key West, Florida
WEZK in Knoxville, Tennessee
KBMI and KXTZ in Las Vegas, Nevada
KPOL-FM, KNOB, KJOI, KOST and KBIG-FM in Los Angeles, California
WVEZ in Louisville, Kentucky
KTMT-FM in Medford, Oregon
WDBN in Medina, Ohio (served Akron, Canton, and Cleveland markets)
WLYF in Miami, Florida
WEZW in Milwaukee, Wisconsin
WAYL and KEEY in Minneapolis-Saint Paul
WZEZ in Nashville, Tennessee
WVNJ in Newark, New Jersey
WKCI-FM in New Haven, Connecticut
WBFM (later WPIX-FM), WTFM and WRFM in New York City
KNPT-FM in Newport, Oregon
WDBO-FM and WSSP in Orlando, Florida
KWXY in Palm Springs, California
WPAT-AM-FM in Paterson, New Jersey
WEAZ and WDVR (later WEAZ-FM) and WQAL (later WWSH) in Philadelphia, Pennsylvania
KRFM (later KQYT), KMEO-FM and KDOT in Phoenix, Arizona
WKJF (later WKOI and WJOI) and WSHH in Pittsburgh, Pennsylvania
KXL-FM, KUPL-FM, KJIB and KQFM in Portland, Oregon
WHJY and WLKW-AM-FM in Providence, Rhode Island
WPVR (now WSLC-FM) in Roanoke, Virginia
WEZO in Rochester
KAER, KCTC and KEWT in Sacramento, California
WGER in Saginaw, Michigan
KQXT is San Antonio, Texas
KSDO, K-JOY, KFMB-FM and XTRA in San Diego, California
KOIT-FM and KFOG in San Francisco
KEUT, KIXI-AM-FM, KEZX, KSEA and KBRD in Seattle-Tacoma
WJYW in Southport, North Carolina
KXLY-FM in Spokane, Washington
KEZK in St. Louis, Missouri
WFLA-FM, WDUV and WWBA-FM in Tampa/St. Petersburg
WLQR in Toledo, Ohio
WGAY-FM in Washington, D.C.
WWYZ in Western Connecticut
WEAT in West Palm Beach, Florida
KUEZ in Yakima, Washington

See also
Easy listening
Light music
Sentimental ballad
Lounge music
Adult standards
Middle of the road (music)
Soft rock
Adult contemporary
Contemporary Hit Radio
Adult Top 40
Smooth jazz
Elevator music
Muzak
Background music

References

External links

20th-century music genres
Easy listening music